Malvastrum is a genus of flowering plants belonging to the family Malvaceae.

Its native range is the New World.

Species
Species:

Malvastrum amblyphyllum 
Malvastrum americanum 
Malvastrum aurantiacum 
Malvastrum bicuspidatum 
Malvastrum boyuibeanum 
Malvastrum chillagoense 
Malvastrum corchorifolium 
Malvastrum coromandelianum 
Malvastrum cristobalianum 
Malvastrum fryxellii 
Malvastrum grandiflorum 
Malvastrum guatemalense 
Malvastrum hillii 
Malvastrum hispidum 
Malvastrum interruptum 
Malvastrum ionthocarpum 
Malvastrum multicuspidatum 
Malvastrum pucarense 
Malvastrum scoparioides 
Malvastrum spiciflorum 
Malvastrum tomentosum 
Malvastrum trifidum 
Malvastrum uniapiculatum

References

Malveae
Malvaceae genera